The B-Boys were an American old-school hip hop group, consisted of rappers Donald D, Brother-B, and DJ Chuck Chillout. They were signed to Vincent Davis' Vintertainment label in the United States and Morgan Khan's Streetwave label in the United Kingdom. The group has released five singles from 1983 to 1985, including a 12-inch extended play Cuttin' Herbie, which debuted on 28 January 1984 at number 90 on the UK Albums Chart. A few of their songs became very sampled among other rappers and producers.

After the group was disbanded, Charles "Chuck Chillout" Turner become a successful radio DJ on 98.7 Kiss FM and has released a studio album with Jack "Kool Chip" Blakney; and Donald "Dondee" Lamont went on to Los Angeles, California joining Ice-T's Rhymes Syndicate and also released two solo studio albums.

Discography 
Singles & EPs

References

External links

American hip hop groups
Musical groups from the Bronx